Bayugan, officially the City of Bayugan, is a 5th class component city in the province of Agusan del Sur, Philippines. According to the 2020 census, it has a population of 109,499 people..

Gained cityhood through Republic Act No. 9405, it is the only city in the province of Agusan del Sur.

Located at the northern part of Agusan del Sur, Bayugan is the "cut-flower capital" of the province owing to its lucrative cut flower industry. The city's climate, especially in the highland barangays, is conducive to high yield cut-flower production. The city is also one of the major producers of rice and vegetables in the province, even providing for neighboring municipalities and provinces.

Etymology

The natives called the area Bayugan since the word bayugan is a Manobo term for pathway. Another version states that bayug trees used to grow abundantly in the area. It was also believed that the natives used to make this place their meeting spot and that the means of gathering the inhabitants was by knocking on a hollow piece of wood which they termed as the bayug.

History
Bayugan was formerly a sitio of Barangay Maygatasan, Esperanza. Several versions abound on how the sitio got its name. First, the place was located along the river which served as the pathway of the natives in going to Esperanza.

In 1942, Japanese troops entered Bayugan during the second World War.

In 1945, the town of Bayugan in Southern Agusan was liberated by Filipino soldiers and guerrillas from the Japanese forces occupying the town.

In 1948, the Department of Public Works and Highways conducted a survey for a National Highway that would connect Butuan with Davao City. Simultaneously, the Bureau of Lands surveyed the places that would be traversed by the proposed road. Possible town sites were identified and among them was Barangay Maygatasan. However, part of the National Highway (now the Narra Avenue) passed through the sitio of Bayugan instead of Barangay Maygatasan. Migrants started settling in the sitio of Bayugan, thus, prompting the transfer of the proposed town site.

In the early part of 1960, the inhabitants led by Mr. Jose Joson passed a resolution creating the sitio of Bayugan into a regular barrio. In April of that year, Barangay Bayugan was inaugurated with Joson as the Teniente del Barrio. Brought about by the construction of the National Highway which traversed the place, business activity sprouted rapidly in the area.

A year later, barangay officials led by then Sergio Mullaneda worked out the creation of Bayugan into a regular municipality through the assistance of Governor Democrito O. Plaza, Governor of Agusan. By virtue of Executive Order No. 440 of then President Carlos P. Garcia, the petition to create the municipality of Bayugan was granted on August 6, 1961. Mr. Mullaneda, the first appointed Municipal Mayor of Bayugan assumed into office on August 6, 1962, during the term of President Diosdado Macapagal. In the year 2007 Bayugan was converted to a city.

Bayugan is a transportation highway nexus for the eastern part of Mindanao Island. Bayugan is now one if not the fastest growing component city in North Eastern Mindanao.

Cityhood

On July 24, 2006, the congress approved R.A. 9405, an act converting the Municipality of Bayugan into a component city to be known as the City of Bayugan.

But in 2008, the Supreme Court of the Philippines declared the law unconstitutional. The court ruled that Bayugan, along with the other fifteen cities covered by the law did not meet the requirements for cityhood.

More than a year later, on December 22, 2009, acting favorably on the appeal of the sixteen affected cities, the Supreme Court reversed its earlier ruling. It deemed that the passage of the amendatory law regarding the criteria for cityhood as set by congress specifically exempting a particular political subdivision therefrom was constitutional. The court further ruled that congress, in enacting the exempting law, effectively decreased the already codified indicators. As such, the cityhood status of Bayugan, and the rest of the fifteen local government units was restored.

But again on August 24, 2010, in a 16-page resolution, the court reinstated its November 18, 2008 decision striking down the constitutionality of Republic Act 9405. Voting 7–6, with two justices abstaining, the court reinstated its decision declaring RA 9405 as unconstitutional.

However, in another twist of fate for Bayugan, the court once again upheld for the third and final time the constitutionality of RA 9405 on February 15, 2011, thereby finalizing the cityhood of Bayugan and the other fifteen municipalities affected by the law.  On July 3, 2011, the court ordered its clerk of court to issue an entry of judgment on the cityhood case, sealing with finality the constitutionality of the law.

After six years of legal battle, in its board resolution, the League of Cities of the Philippines acknowledged and recognized the cityhood of Bayugan and 15 other cities.

Geography
Bayugan is bordered by the Municipality of Sibagat and the province of Surigao del Sur to the north; the Municipality of Prosperidad to the east; the Municipality of Esperanza to the south; and the Municipality of Las Nieves, Agusan del Norte, to the west.

Climate

The city is geographically situated below the typhoon belt but is usually affected by depressions forming in the typhoon regions of Visayas and the province of Surigao del Norte. The climate map of the Philippines based on the modified coronas classification shows that the city falls under Type II. Which also is the weather classification of the province of Agusan del Sur.

Type II climate has no dry season with very pronounced wet season of heavy precipitation. Maximum rainfall generally occurs from December to January although there is no single dry month. Areas characterized by this climate type are generally along or very near the eastern coast thus are open to the north-east monsoon.

Barangays
Bayugan is politically subdivided into 43 barangays, of which 3 are urban and 40 are rural.

Demographics

Indigenous people:
Manobo
Higaonon
Banwaon
Kamayo/Mandaya
Talaandig

Economy

Products:

Fertile soil suitable for agricultural, Protection Forest About 26,107.163 Hectares = 51.697% in land classifications. Gold, silver, sand and gravel.

Government

City officials
Elected city officials 2019–present:

Executive:
Mayor: Kirk A. Asis
Vice Mayor: Kim Lope A. Asis

Legislative:
City councilors:
Teresito "Terry" Abastillas
Primitivo N. Alimpoos
Badat Alonde-Rana
Charles P. Anggayong
Kim A. Asis
Rizalina A. Parba
Allan R. Cogollodo
Fortunato "Jun" Paway II
Almira "Balong" Salvan
Jonathan D. Sayon

Barangay council
Association of Baragay Councils (Liga ng mga Barangay):

President - Eleony G. Estrera (Barangay Gethsemane)
Vice President - Vacant position

Tourism

Culture

Local festivals and events

Kahimunan tu Bayugan Festival, Holy Child - A local version of the Sinulog Festival of Cebu, it is highlighted by street dancing focusing on the indigenous tribes' of Bayugan and their way of life. Celebrated every Last Sunday of January.
Sacred Heart of Jesus Festival – Popularly known as the town fiesta or "pista", celebrated every June 30.
Rice Corn and Flower Festival - A new born festival replacing the traditional "Araw ng Bayugan" and is a celebration of the abundant harvest of crops of farmers in the city. The name of the festival is coined from the nickname of the city (City of Rice, Corn, and Flowers). It highlights street dancing and float contests.
Charter Day Celebration- Held every June 21 to commemorate the city-hood of Bayugan.

Infrastructure

Communications
The Philippine Long Distance Telephone Company provides fixed line services. Wireless mobile communications services are provided by Smart Communications and Globe Telecommunications.

Transportation
Major transportation around the vicinity of the city are Motorela/Tricycle and some multicabs which travel to remote barangays. "Habal-habal" is also used as a transport to the mountain barangays of Bayugan.

Accessibility
By air
Butuan Airport: Butuan has the nearest airport from Bayugan.

Davao Airport: From Manila or Cebu to Davao City as transit point.

Surigao Airport: From Manila or Cebu to Surigao City as transit point.

By land
Bayugan can be reached via land transport. Davao Metro Shuttle, Bachelor Express, Land Car Inc., and Surigao Express are only few bus companies travelling to and from the city. Buses are serving routes from Davao City, Butuan, Surigao City, and Bislig. Philtranco and PP Bus Line serving Pasay/Cubao via Butuan or Davao are also available.

By sea
Inter-island vessels Cokaliong Shipping Lines, 2-Go and TransAsia Shipping Lines ply the Cebu-Nasipit routes on regular schedules with Nasipit Port as transit point. Multi-cabs and buses are available at the wharf going to Butuan Integrated Terminal for the regular bus trips to Bayugan.

Education

Agusan del Sur Pilot Laboratory School, or commonly known as ADSPILS, is a Public Elementary School. ADSPILS is the only Special Science Elementary School in the city. The school has about 600 pupils with over 3 sections in each grade, Science Class, Best Class and Crack.

Bayugan National Comprehensive High School, or BNCHS, is a comprehensive high school with a population of about six thousand students, and is located on a site that has an area of 5 hectares. The school is currently recognized for its research program in science related topics. "Comprehensive" it is because it offers different curricula such as ESEP (Engineering and Science Education Program), Special Program in Journalism (pilot school for journalism in Caraga Region), Special Program in the Arts (with the specialization of Visual Arts, Creative Writing, Dancing, Music, Media Arts and Theater Arts), Technical Vocational Courses, Special Program in Sports and Revised Basic Education Curriculum.

Agusan del Sur College or ADSCO established in 1966, is the only private educational institution in the city offering Preparatory, Elementary, High School, College (CHED) degree courses i.e. Bachelor of Science in Business Administration (BSBA) major in : Marketing Management, Financial Management, Operation Management, Bachelor of Secondary Education, Bachelor of Elementary Education, Bachelor of Arts major in English, Associate in Computer Secretarial, Bachelor of Science in Hotel and Restaurant Management (by year 2011) and TESDA programs like Health Care Services NC II, Computer Hardware Servicing NC II, Shielded Metal Arc Welding (SMAW) NC II, Driving NC II, Security Services NC II, Massage Therapy NC II, Housekeeping, Commercial Cooking NC II, Bookkeeping NC II.

Father Saturnino Urios University (formerly Father Urios Technical Institute of Bayugan Inc. or FUTIBI), is the oldest private educational institution in the city. Located at the heart of the city making it one of the most populous school in Bayugan. Created in the year 1959, Urios caters elementary and secondary basic education. By school year 2010–2011, Urios will be putting up its technical courses. The school was founded by a Jesuit priest Father Atanasio B. De Castro in 1959. The school is currently headed by Mrs. Chereil C. Martel (Principal) and Fr. Roberto Butawan (School Director).

Sister cities

 Butuan, Philippines
 Davao City, Philippines
 Makati, Philippines
 Cebu City, Philippines

Gallery

References

External links

 [ Philippine Standard Geographic Code]
A History of Bayugan at the Agusan–Surigao Historical Archive
 
Municipality of Bayugan Official Website

Cities in Caraga
Populated places in Agusan del Sur
Populated places established in 1961
1961 establishments in the Philippines
Component cities in the Philippines
Establishments by Philippine executive order